The d'Entrecasteaux Ridge (DER) is a double oceanic ridge in the south-west Pacific Ocean, north of New Caledonia and west of Vanuatu Islands.  It forms the northern extension of the New Caledonia–Loyalty Islands arc, and is now actively subducting under the Vanuatu/New Hebrides arc.
The subduction of the DER is responsible for the anomalous morphology of the central part of New Hebrides arc whose movement more closely matches the north-east direction of the subducting Australian Plate (the rest of the New Hebrides arc rotate west in front of the southward expanding North Fiji Basin).

The name honours French naval officer Antoine Bruni d'Entrecasteaux, explorer of the south-west Pacific in the late 18th century.

Geological setting
The DER extends north from the New Caledonia ridge to the New Hebrides/Vanuatu Trench and thus separates the North Loyalty Basin to the south from the West Santos Basin ( bsl) to the north.
The DER has a western and an eastern part with distinct morphologies: the arcuate western part is an elongated graben flanked by two near-parallel horsts; the eastern part widens to the east where it split into a southern and northern ridge.

The southern ridge is composed of 36 -old extinct stratovolcanoes.
It is a seamount chain on-top of a broad east–west-trending ridge.  The seamounts, including the Sabine Bank which reaches  bsl, are the volcanic remnants of an old island arc.  A -deep scarp separates the southern ridge from the North Loyalty Basin to the south.
The Bougainville Guyot, south of Santos, forms the eastern continuation of the seamount chain and is a Middle Miocene andesitic volcano covered by Oligocene to Miocene lagoonal limestone.

The northern ridge, a more continuous ridge similar in composition to the Mariana fore-arc, forms part of an abandoned, north-facing oceanic trench which has been subducting under the New Hebrides island arc during the last 2–3 Ma.
The northern DER reaches  bsl.

Early Eocene MORB-type basalts (mid-ocean ridge) have been dredged from this scarp whereas Late Eocene MORBs have been dredged from a ridge north of it. The western platform has experienced an Eocene compressional phase followed by Middle Miocene to Quaternary uplift and tilt.

The eastern part of the DER is an abandoned plate boundary which was part of a south-dipping subduction zone before the Miocene.

References

Notes

Sources

 
 
 
 

Underwater ridges of the Pacific Ocean